The 2002 season was the Chicago Bears' 83rd in the National Football League and their fourth under head coach Dick Jauron.

The team had hopes of returning to the playoffs after an unexpected 13–3 season the previous year, However, the team failed to improve on that record and finished with a 4–12 record and missed the postseason for the second time in three years. The Bears had problems on both sides of the ball, finishing 27th in the league in points scored and 23rd in points allowed. The Bears began the season 2–0, but things quickly fell apart as the team fell into an eight-game losing streak, including a loss at home to the New England Patriots where, despite having a 27–6 lead at some point, the Patriots came back and won the game late in the fourth quarter. After this, the Bears never recovered, finishing 4–12 and in third place in their division, the newly aligned NFC North.

Because Soldier Field was being rebuilt, the Bears were forced to play all of their home games Downstate in Champaign, at Memorial Stadium on the campus of the University of Illinois. The Bears never seemed to get used to their new home field, and injuries piled up as the season went on for both offense and defense. Starting QB Jim Miller was injured throughout the year, leaving the team no choice but to use backup Chris Chandler and rookie third-string QB Henry Burris for both spot relief and as starters. 2001 NFL Offensive Rookie of the Year Anthony Thomas suffered a broken right index finger in Week 15 against the Green Bay Packers. These injuries and the league's 23rd worst turnover differential contributed to the team's franchise record-tying eight-game losing streak and their poor record.

Offseason

2002 Expansion Draft

Draft

Undrafted free agents

Training camp
2002 marked the first Bears Training Camp at Olivet Nazarene University in Bourbonnais, Illinois, after practicing at University of Wisconsin–Platteville from 1984 to 2001. Other candidates in the selection process included universities like Eastern Illinois in Charleston, Illinois State in Normal, Millikin in Decatur, Northern Illinois in DeKalb, Southern Illinois Carbondale and Edwardsville, and Urbana–Champaign; smaller schools like Knox College in Galesburg, Monmouth College in Monmouth, and Rockford College in Rockford; and the Chanute Air Force Base near Rantoul, where the Illinois Fighting Illini held their offseason camps.

The list was eventually narrowed to Eastern Illinois, Millikin, Northern Illinois, and Olivet Nazarene. On July 17, 2001, the Bears announced Olivet Nazarene as the new Training Camp site on a two-year deal.

Staff

Roster

Preseason

Regular season

Schedule

Game Summaries

Week 1: vs. Minnesota Vikings

Week 2: at Atlanta Falcons

Week 3: vs. New Orleans Saints

Week 4: at Buffalo Bills

Week 5: vs. Green Bay Packers

Week 7: at Detroit Lions

Week 8: at Minnesota Vikings

Week 9: vs. Philadelphia Eagles

Week 10: vs. New England Patriots

Week 11: at St. Louis Rams

Week 12: vs. Detroit Lions

Week 13: at Green Bay Packers

Week 14: at Miami Dolphins

Week 15: vs. New York Jets

Week 16: at Carolina Panthers

Week 17: Tampa Bay Buccaneers

Standings

References

External links
 Chicago Bears Official Website

Chicago
Chicago Bears seasons
Bear
2000s in Chicago
2002 in Illinois